Otavnik is a settlement southeast of Tržišče in the Municipality of Sevnica in east-central Slovenia. The area is part of the historical region of Lower Carniola. The municipality is included in the Lower Sava Statistical Region.

References

External links
Otavnik at Geopedia

Populated places in the Municipality of Sevnica